George Lawrence Sacco Jr. (July 19, 1936–) is an American lawyer and politician who served as a member of the Massachusetts House of Representatives and was a candidate for Massachusetts Attorney General.

Early life
Sacco was born on July 19, 1936 in Medford, Massachusetts. He attended Medford High School, Worcester Academy, Northeastern University, Suffolk University, and Suffolk University Law School. In 1967 he married Elaine Golden, daughter of state legislator J. Laurence Golden.

Political career
From 1959 to 1962, Sacco was a member of the Medford school committee. From 1963 to 1974 he was a member of the Massachusetts House of Representatives. In 1974 he was a candidate for Massachusetts Attorney General. He finished second in the six-candidate Democratic primary with 23% of the vote.

References

1936 births
Massachusetts lawyers
Democratic Party members of the Massachusetts House of Representatives
Northeastern University alumni
Suffolk University alumni
Suffolk University Law School alumni
Politicians from Medford, Massachusetts
Living people